Asticcacaulis endophyticus is a Gram-negative, strictly aerobic, rod-shaped and motile bacterium from the genus of Asticcacaulis which has been isolated from the roots of the plant Geum aleppicum from the Taibai Mountain in China.

References 

Caulobacterales
Bacteria described in 2014